Under and Over was a 1971 BBC television situation comedy, which lasted one series of six episodes.

In it The Bachelors, an Irish singing trio, played Irish labourers working on the construction of a new London Underground line.

Bob Keegan played Lord Brentwood, the boss of the construction company, who was also Irish.

It featured culture clashes between Irish and British people, and the ambiguous position of people of Irish background in Britain.

Sources

External links
IMDB entry

BBC television sitcoms
1971 British television series debuts
1971 British television series endings
1970s British sitcoms
English-language television shows
Television shows set in London
London Underground in popular culture